Lubieszów may refer to the following places:

Lubieszów, Nowa Sól County in Lubusz Voivodeship (west Poland)
Lubieszów, Żagań County in Lubusz Voivodeship (west Poland)
Lubieszów, Opole Voivodeship (south-west Poland)
Lyubeshiv, Ukraine